Paul S. Mischel (born July 13, 1962) is an American physician-scientist whose laboratory has made pioneering discoveries in the pathogenesis of human cancer. He is currently a Professor and Vice Chair of Research for the Department of Pathology and Institute Scholar of ChEM-H, Stanford University. Mischel was elected into the American Society for Clinical Investigation (ASCI), serving as ASCI president in 2010/11. He was inducted into the Association of American Physicians, and was elected as a fellow of the American Association for the Advancement of Science.

Career 
Mischel was born on July 13, 1962. After losing his father to cancer, he became committed to a career in cancer research. He attended the University of Pennsylvania and received his M.D. from Cornell University Medical College in 1991, graduating Alpha Omega Alpha. Mischel completed residency training in Anatomic Pathology and Neuropathology at UCLA, followed by post-doctoral research training with Louis Reichardt at HHMI-UCSF. Mischel joined the faculty of UCLA in 1998. In August 2012, he was recruited to the Ludwig Institute for Cancer Research, San Diego and UCSD. In 2021, he joined Stanford University School of Medicine, where he currently serves as a Professor and Vice Chair of Research for the Department of Pathology and Institute Scholar of ChEM-H.

Research 
Mischel’s work bridges cancer genetics, signal transduction and cellular metabolism in the pathogenesis of human cancer.

Extrachromosomal oncogene amplification 
Mischel found that tumors can dynamically change in response to changing environments at a rate that cannot be explained by classical genetics. Prior to 2017, extrachromosomal DNA was thought to be a rare, but interesting event in cancer (1.4% of tumors), of unclear biological significance. Mischel and colleagues integrated whole genome sequencing, cytogenetics and structural modeling to accurately and globally quantify extrachromosomal oncogene amplification, measure its diversity, map its contents, and study its biochemical regulation. They demonstrated widespread extrachromosomal oncogene amplification across many cancer types, showed that it potently drives tumor evolution and drug resistance, and identified specific signaling, biochemical and metabolic mechanisms that control its copy number and activity in response to changing environmental conditions. This ground-breaking work challenges existing chromosomal maps of cancer, provides new insights into the mechanisms controlling the level, location and activity of amplified oncogenes, and yields new paradigms in the genotype-environment interactions that promote cancer progression and drug resistance.

Metabolic co-dependency pathways in cancer 
Integrating mechanistic studies with analyses of tumor tissue from patients treated in clinical trials, Mischel and colleagues discovered signaling, transcriptional, and metabolic co-dependencies that are downstream consequences of oncogene amplification, including alterations in glucose and lipid metabolism that drive tumor growth, progression and drug resistance. These studies, focused primarily on the highly lethal brain cancer, glioblastoma, resulted in new understandings of the fundamental metabolic processes by which oncogene amplification drives cancer progression and drug resistance, demonstrating a central role for EGFR and its downstream effector mTORC2, in cancer pathogenesis through metabolic reprogramming.

Awards and honors 
Alpha Omega Alpha, Cornell University Medical College, 1991

Pfizer New Faculty Award (one in Neuroscience in United States), 1996

The Johnny Mercer Foundation Research Award, 2004

America’s Top Doctors for Cancer (Castle Connolly and U.S. News & World Report), 2006–present

Farber Award (top brain tumor research award given jointly by the American Association of Neurological Surgeons and the Society for NeuroOncology), 2007

American Society for Clinical Investigation, 2007

Profiled by Journal of Cell Biology in the “People and Ideas” section, 2008

President, American Society for Clinical Investigation, 2010–2011

Association of American Physicians, 2012

Elected Fellow, American Association for the Advancement of Science, 2015

Personal life 
Mischel lives in La Jolla, California with his wife, Deborah Kado, a Professor of Medicine at UCSD, and his daughters Anna and Sarah.

References

External links 
 Paul Mischell's lab website

1962 births
Living people
University of Pennsylvania alumni
Cancer researchers
Fellows of the American Association for the Advancement of Science
Weill Cornell Medical College alumni
University of California, Los Angeles faculty
University of California, San Diego faculty